Ptichodis herbarum, the common ptichodis moth, is a moth in the family Erebidae. It is found in the United States (including Alabama, Florida, Georgia, Maryland, Mississippi, North Carolina, Ohio, Oklahoma, South Carolina, Tennessee, and Texas). It has also been recorded from Jamaica.

The wingspan is about 30 mm.

The larvae feed on bush clover and possibly other Lespedeza species.

References

Moths described in 1852
Ptichodis